Saskatoon Eastview is a provincial electoral district for the Legislative Assembly of Saskatchewan, Canada. This district includes the neighbourhoods of Queen Elizabeth, Eastview, Nutana Park, Adelaide/Churchill and Avalon.

The riding was created for the 18th Saskatchewan general election out of parts of Saskatoon Nutana Centre, Saskatoon Nutana South and Hanley.

Members of the Legislative Assembly

Election results

|-

 
|NDP
|Judy Junor
|align="right"|3,588
|align="right"|39.56
|align="right"|-5.80

|- bgcolor="white"
!align="left" colspan=3|Total
!align="right"|9,071
!align="right"|100.00
!align="right"|

|-
 
| style="width: 130px" |NDP
|Judy Junor
|align="right"|4,508
|align="right"|45.36
|align="right"|+0.72

|- bgcolor="white"
!align="left" colspan=3|Total
!align="right"|9,938
!align="right"|100.00
!align="right"|

|-
 
| style="width: 130px" |NDP
|Judy Junor
|align="right"|4,164
|align="right"|44.64
|align="right"|+1.14

|- bgcolor="white"
!align="left" colspan=3|Total
!align="right"|9,328
!align="right"|100.00
!align="right"|

|-
 
| style="width: 130px" |NDP
|Judy Junor
|align="right"|3,644
|align="right"|43.50
|align="right"|-1.65

|- bgcolor="white"
!align="left" colspan=3|Total
!align="right"|8,378
!align="right"|100.00
!align="right"|

|-
 
| style="width: 130px" |NDP
|Judy Junor
|align="right"|2,904
|align="right"|45.15
|align="right"|-10.53

|- bgcolor="white"
!align="left" colspan=3|Total
!align="right"|6,432
!align="right"|100.00
!align="right"|

|-
 
| style="width: 130px" |NDP
|Bob Pringle
|align="right"|4,738
|align="right"|55.68
|align="right"|+3.15

 
|Prog. Conservative
|Richard Bing-Wo
|align="right"|699
|align="right"|8.22
|align="right"|-11.05
|- bgcolor="white"
!align="left" colspan=3|Total
!align="right"|8,509
!align="right"|100.00
!align="right"|

|-
 
| style="width: 130px" |NDP
|Bob Pringle
|align="right"|4,630
|align="right"|52.53
|align="right"|-1.00

 
|Prog. Conservative
|Bob Myers
|align="right"|1,698
|align="right"|19.27
|align="right"|-7.40
|- bgcolor="white"
!align="left" colspan=3|Total
!align="right"|8,813
!align="right"|100.00
!align="right"|

|-
 
| style="width: 130px" |NDP
|Bob Pringle
|align="right"|6,685
|align="right"|53.53
|align="right"|+14.59
 
|Prog. Conservative
|Toni Davidson
|align="right"|3,330
|align="right"|26.67
|align="right"|-16.41

|- bgcolor="white"
!align="left" colspan=3|Total
!align="right"|12,488
!align="right"|100.00
!align="right"|

|-
 
| style="width: 130px" |Prog. Conservative
|Ray Martineau
|align="right"|6,356
|align="right"|43.08
|align="right"|-18.13
 
|NDP
|Dixie Campbell-Tymchatyn
|align="right"|5,745
|align="right"|38.94
|align="right"|+6.18

|- bgcolor="white"
!align="left" colspan=3|Total
!align="right"|14,754
!align="right"|100.00
!align="right"|

|-
 
| style="width: 130px" |Prog. Conservative
|Kimberly Young
|align="right"|6,981
|align="right"|61.21
|align="right"|+22.57
 
|NDP
|Bernard Poniatowski
|align="right"|3,736
|align="right"|32.76
|align="right"|-13.98

|- bgcolor="white"
!align="left" colspan=3|Total
!align="right"|11,405
!align="right"|100.00
!align="right"|

|-
 
| style="width: 130px" |NDP
|Bernard Poniatowski
|align="right"|4,018
|align="right"|46.74
|align="right"|+11.81
 
|Prog. Conservative
|Kimberly Young
|align="right"|3,322
|align="right"|38.64
|align="right"|+18.55

|- bgcolor="white"
!align="left" colspan=3|Total
!align="right"|8,597
!align="right"|100.00
!align="right"|

|-

 
|NDP
|Reg Parker
|align="right"|2,466
|align="right"|34.93
|align="right"|-17.41
 
|Prog. Conservative
|Larry Fast
|align="right"|1,418
|align="right"|20.09
|align="right"|-
|- bgcolor="white"
!align="left" colspan=3|Total
!align="right"|7,059
!align="right"|100.00
!align="right"|

References

External links 
Website of the Legislative Assembly of Saskatchewan
Saskatchewan Archives Board – Provincial Election Results By Electoral Division

Saskatchewan provincial electoral districts
Politics of Saskatoon